Oktyabrsky District (Oktyabrin rayon) is an administrative and municipal district (raion), one of the thirteen in the Republic of Kalmykia, Russia. It is located in the north of the republic. Its administrative center is the rural locality (a settlement) of Bolshoy Tsaryn. As of the 2010 Census, the total population of the district was 9,438, with the population of Bolshoy Tsaryn accounting for 58.2% of that number.

History
The district was established in 1977.

Administrative and municipal status
Within the framework of administrative divisions, Oktyabrsky District is one of the thirteen in the Republic of Kalmykia. The district is divided into seven rural administrations which comprise twelve rural localities. As a municipal division, the district is incorporated as Oktyabrsky Municipal District. Its seven rural administrations are incorporated as seven rural settlements within the municipal district. The settlement of Bolshoy Tsaryn serves as the administrative center of both the administrative and municipal district.

References

Notes

Sources

Districts of Kalmykia
 
States and territories established in 1977
